The archbishop of Quebec is the head of the Roman Catholic Archdiocese of Quebec, who is responsible for looking after its spiritual and administrative needs.  As the archdiocese is the metropolitan see of the ecclesiastical province encompassing the north-central part of the province of Quebec, the Archbishop of Quebec also administers the bishops who head the suffragan dioceses of Chicoutimi, Sainte-Anne-de-la-Pocatière, and Trois-Rivières.  The current archbishop is Gérald Lacroix.

The archdiocese began as the Vicariate Apostolic of New France, which was created on April 11, 1658.  François de Laval was appointed its first bishop, and under his reign, the Séminaire de Québec was established.  On October 1, 1674, the vicariate was elevated to the status of diocese.  It was raised to the level of archdiocese on January 12, 1819, and subsequently became a metropolitan see when the ecclesiastical province of Quebec was constituted in 1844.  In recognition of its status as the first diocese north of Mexico and New Spain, the Archdiocese of Quebec was designated as the country's primatial see on January 24, 1956.  Maurice Roy became the first archbishop to hold the honorific title of Primate of Canada.

Fifteen men have been Archbishop of Quebec; another ten were heads of its antecedent jurisdictions.  Of these, seven were members of institutes of consecrated life or societies of apostolic life.  Eight archbishops were elevated to the College of Cardinals.  Louis-Philippe Mariauchau d'Esgly, the eighth ordinary of the archdiocese, was the first bishop to be born in Canada.  His immediate successor, Jean-François Hubert, whose episcopacy spanned from 1788 to 1797, was the first bishop born in Quebec City.  Jean-Baptiste de La Croix de Chevrières de Saint-Vallier had the longest tenure as Bishop of Quebec, serving for 39 years from 1688 to 1727, while Paul-Eugène Roy held the position for seven months (1925–1926), marking the shortest archepiscopacy.

List of ordinaries

Apostolic Vicars of New France

Bishops of Quebec

Archbishops of Quebec

Notes

References
General

 
 

Footnotes

Bibliography

Christianity in Quebec
Quebec
Roman Catholic archbishops